Benjamin Terry may refer to:

 Benjamin Franklin Terry (1821–1861), raised and commanded the 8th Texas Cavalry Regiment, popularly known as Terry's Texas Rangers
 Benjamin Terry (footballer) (born 1994), Ghanaian footballer